Flying Colors is an album by saxophonist Ricky Ford which was recorded in 1980 and released on the Muse label.

Reception

The Rolling Stone Jazz Record Guide said: "Perhaps the best view of Ford the improviser is afforded on Flying Colors, a first-class program of music by Strayhorn, Ellington and Monk." The AllMusic review by Scott Yanow stated: "Ricky Ford was one of the top tenors to emerge during the '70s and early '80s. This Muse set finds him matched with a top-notch rhythm section ... It was a fine showcase for the up-and-coming tenor".

Track listing
All compositions by Ricky Ford except where noted
 "Jordanian Walk" – 8:26
 "Chelsea Bridge" (Billy Strayhorn) – 4:25
 "Take the Coltrane" (Duke Ellington) – 4:36
 "Bye-Ya" (Thelonious Monk) – 5:45
 "Olympic Glaze" – 4:55
 "Portrait of Mingus" – 4:25
 "Flying Colors" – 4:15

Personnel
Ricky Ford - tenor saxophone
John Hicks – piano 
Walter Booker – bass 
Jimmy Cobb – drums

References

Muse Records albums
Ricky Ford albums
1980 albums
Albums recorded at Van Gelder Studio
Albums produced by Bob Porter (record producer)